The 2018–19 Hampton Pirates men's basketball team represented Hampton University during the 2018–19 NCAA Division I men's basketball season. The Pirates, led by tenth-year head coach Edward Joyner, played their home games at the Hampton Convocation Center in Hampton, Virginia as first-year members of the Big South Conference. They finished the season 18–17, 9–7 in Big South play to finish in a four-way tie for fifth place. They defeated Longwood in the first round of the Big South tournament before losing in the quarterfinals to Campbell. They were invited to the CollegeInsider.com Tournament where they defeated St. Francis Brooklyn in the first round to win the Coach John McLendon Classic, fellow Big South member Charleston Southern in the second round, and NJIT in the quarterfinals before losing in the semifinals to Marshall.

Previous season
They finished the season 19–16, 12–4 in MEAC play to finish in a three-way tie for the MEAC Regular season championship. After tiebreakers, they received the No. 1 seed in the MEAC tournament where they Florida A&M and North Carolina A&T to advance to the championship game where they lost to North Carolina Central. As a regular season conference champion, and No. 1 seed in their conference tournament, who failed to win their conference tournament, they received an automatic bid to the National Invitation Tournament where they lost in the first round to Notre Dame.

The season was the Pirates' final season as members of the MEAC, as the school announced on November 16, 2017 that they will join the Big South Conference for the 2018–19 season.

Roster

Accolades

Athlon Sports All Big South Second Team 
Jermaine Marrow

Lindy's Sports All Conference Second Team 
Jermaine Marrow

Schedule and results

|-
!colspan=9 style=| Non-conference regular season

|-
!colspan=9 style=| Big South regular season

|-
!colspan=9 style=| Big South tournament

|-
!colspan=9 style=| CollegeInsider.com Postseason tournament

References

Hampton Pirates men's basketball seasons
Hampton
Hampton Pirates
Hampton Pirates
Hampton